Arunachal Pradesh Statehood Day is state holiday which observes in every year at 20 February on the occasion of formation of Arunachal Pradesh.

History 
It was first observed on 20 February 1987 when Arunachal Pradesh was declared as 24th state of India. In 2022, this day was celebrated as 36th State Foundation Day.

References 

Indian state foundation days
Observances in India